Pascal of Bollywood (born Pascal Heni; 1963) is a French actor and singer who gained fame in India as the first Westerner to reinterpret the songs of Indian cinema in Hindi, Tamil and Bengali.  He is best known for his Hindi and French cover of Edith Piaf's "La Vie en rose".

Biography

Pascal Heni was born in Paris in 1963 into a family of pied-noirs. His artistic career began at the age of 15 years with courses in drama and theater. While traveling in Malaysia in 1987 he heard the Hindi song "Zindagi Ek Safar Hai Suhana" from the film Andaz and became fascinated with Bollywood music. Upon his return to France he began studying Indian languages and emulating the style of Kishore Kumar, his favorite singer.

In 2001, he went to India where he sang the popular Indian standard repertoire of the 1950s through the 1970s and embarked on an India-wide concert tour. He recorded his first album with a large Bollywood orchestra in Bombay. Indian composer Pyarelal Sharma of the Laxmikant Pyarelal duo, served as the musical director for the resulting album, Pascal of Bollywood. It was released by Naïve Records in France in October 2004 and was followed by numerous concerts around the world.

The "Frenchman", as The Times of India nicknamed him, returned to Europe on tour to introduce Bollywood music to the West. He has contributed greatly to the growth of Bollywood in France and Europe.

In 2009, Pascal Heni released a French-language album entitled Retour au nom de jeune homme. The music was composed by himself and arranged by three young Indian musicians, Dominique Blanc-Francard and Pyarelal.

Personal life
Heni has been in a relationship with French botanist Patrick Blanc since 1985.

Discography

Albums
1990 N'êtes pas très bavard ce soir
1993 La vie c'est mouvant
1997 Casino des Trépassés
1998 Paradiso, canto XXXIII
2000 Hôtel de Bondeville
2002 Concerts Evolutifs
2003 Zindagi ek safar hai suhana
2004 Pascal of Bollywood
2005 Les Amours Jaunes
2007 Folies Musicales
2009 Retour au nom de jeune homme
2010 Pascal of Massilia
2011 Purgatorio, canto XVII
2011 An Evening in Paris Remix

Compilation albums
2004 Indomania by Béatrice Ardisson (France)
2005 The Best Of by Claude Challe (France)
2005 High Society, Amor (Italy)
2006 City Hippy by Pathaan (England)
2007 Francophonic GM record (Poland)
2007 Musique fantastique by DJ Guuzbourg (Netherlands)
2007 Pieprz i Wanilia by Stanisław Trzciński (Poland)
2008 Various Kampengrooves 2 (Germany)
2008 Cafe Latino Vol. 6 a Special Night Lounge
2009 Love from Jaipur by Béatrice Ardisson (France)
2011 Original Chill Lounge Session
2013 Montecarlo Nights New Classics Vol.6 (Italy)

References

External links
Official website
 Myspace Pascal Héni official

1963 births
French male singers
Hindi-language singers
Bengali-language singers
Tamil-language singers
Living people